Lidiya Yakovlevna Ginzburg (March 18, 1902, Odessa, Russian Empire – July 17, 1990, Leningrad, USSR) was a major Soviet literary critic and historian and a survivor of the siege of Leningrad. She was an inspiration to a new generation of poets.

Biography
She was born in Odessa in 1902 and moved to Leningrad in 1922.  She enrolled there in the State Institute of the History of the Arts, studying with Yury Tynyanov and Boris Eikhenbaum, two major figures of Russian formalism.

Ginzburg survived the purges, the 900-day Leningrad blockade, and the anti-Jewish campaign of the late 1940s and early 1950s and became a friend and inspiration to a new generation of poets, including Alexander Kushner.

She published a number of seminal critical studies, including "Lermontov's Creative Path" ("Tvorcheskii put' Lermontova," 1940), "Herzen's 'My Past and Thoughts'" ("'Byloe i dumy' Gertsena," 1957), On Lyric Poetry ("O lirike," 1964; 2nd exp. ed. 1974), On Psychological Prose ("O psikhologicheskoi proze," 1971; 2nd rev. ed., 1977), and "On the Literary Hero" ("O literaturnom geroe," 1979). On Psychological Prose was published by Princeton University Press in 1991 in an English translation and edition by Judson Rosengrant, and "Blockade Diary" ("Zapiski blokadnogo cheloveka," 1984), her memoir of the siege of Leningrad (8 September 1941 - 27 January 1944), was published by Harvill in 1995 in translation by Alan Myers.

References

1902 births
1990 deaths
Writers from Odesa
People from Kherson Governorate
Odesa Jews
Ukrainian Jews
Russian literary critics
Russian women critics
Women literary critics
Soviet women writers
Soviet historians
20th-century Russian women writers
Soviet women historians
Soviet literary historians
Women literary historians
Writers from Saint Petersburg